This is a complete list of members of the United States Senate during the 12th United States Congress listed by seniority, from March 4, 1811, to March 3, 1813.

Order of service is based on the commencement of the senator's first term. Behind this is former service as a senator (only giving the senator seniority within his or her new incoming class), service as vice president, a House member, a cabinet secretary, or a governor of a state. The final factor is the population of the senator's state.

The two main parties at this point were the Federalists (F), and Democratic Republicans (DR)

Terms of service

U.S. Senate seniority list

See also
12th United States Congress
List of members of the United States House of Representatives in the 12th Congress by seniority

Notes

External links
Senate Seniority List

012